An Azmari (Amharic: አዝማሪ) is an entertainer who sings and plays traditional string instruments of the Ethiopian Highlands. Its comparable to medieval European minstrels or bard or West African griots.
 

Azmari, who may be either male or female, are skilled at singing extemporized verses, accompanying themselves on either a masenqo (one-stringed fiddle) or krar (lyre).

Etymology 

Azmari means (to sing or singer) in Amharic. Amharas tend to call all musicians Azmari simply because there's no other word in the language denoting a person who plays a musical instrument.

History 
The earliest documented mention of the Azmaris goes back to the mid-15th century, and they presumably go back much further.

Role in society 
Azmaris once played an important role as social critics by improvising sophisticated texts of praise or criticism. Azmaris would mock people in high places, and even Emperors were not spared if they were found to be unpopular with the public. Azmaris were the first to convey scandals in high places.

Female Azmaris flourished in feudal Ethiopia. They were just like their male counterparts poet-musicians. The female musicians are usually wives or lovers of male Azmaris who gradually learned the repertory of their male counterparts.

Between 1841-1843, the English traveller Major William Cornwallis Harris captured the prevailing political atmosphere and attitudes of Sahle Selassie's court towards his enemies in a song of praise played by one of his female chorist (azmari).

Today 
Azmaris have continued perform in various settings ranging from wedding ceremonies, to hotels, and in drinking establishments called tejbeit, which specialise in the serving of tej (mead). The Azmaris introduced the popular Tizita ballad form.

Notable Azmari 

 Asnaketch Worku
 Bahru Kegne
 Eténèsh Wassié
 Weres Egeziaber

References

See also
Ethiopian music

Ethiopian music
Occupations in music